Carry On Abroad is a 1972 British comedy film, the 24th release in the series of 31 Carry On films (1958–1992). The film features series regulars Sid James, Kenneth Williams, Joan Sims, Bernard Bresslaw, Barbara Windsor, Kenneth Connor, Peter Butterworth and Hattie Jacques. It was the 23rd and final appearance for Charles Hawtrey. June Whitfield returned after appearing in Carry On Nurse 13 years earlier. Jimmy Logan and  Carol Hawkins made their first of two appearances in the series.

Along with the previous film in the series (Carry On Matron), it features the highest number of the regular Carry On team, and actually surpasses it if you count Terry Scott, who had filmed a scene as an irate Wundatours customer, but his scene was cut from the final film. The only other member missing is Jim Dale, who had left the series by this point, but would return belatedly for Carry On Columbus in 1992. Dale and Scott were never in a Carry On film together.

Plot
The film opens with pub landlord and frequent holidaymaker Vic Flange (Sid James) openly flirting with the sassy saucepot widow Sadie Tompkins (Barbara Windsor) as his battleaxe wife, Cora (Joan Sims), looks on with disdain. Their twitching friend Harry (Jack Douglas), who is prone to elaborate and violent twitches, arrives and reveals that the package holiday Vic has booked to the Mediterranean island Elsbels (a pun on the slang expression "Hell's Bells") which is on the Costa Bomm, also includes Sadie, much to Cora's outrage. Cora, who avoids holidays because she hates flying, suddenly decides to accompany her boorish husband on the trip, to ensure he keeps away from Sadie.

The next day, Stuart Farquhar (Kenneth Williams), the representative of Wundatours Travel Agency, and his sexy, seductive assistant, Moira Plunkett (Gail Grainger), welcome the motley passengers. Among them are the henpecked and sex-starved Stanley Blunt (Kenneth Connor) and his overbearing, conservative, frigid wife, Evelyn (June Whitfield); a drunken, bowler-hatted mummy's boy, Eustace Tuttle (Charles Hawtrey); brash Scotsman Bert Conway (Jimmy Logan); young and beautiful friends Lily and Marge (Sally Geeson and Carol Hawkins respectively), who are each hoping to find a man to fall in love with; and a party of monks, including Brother Bernard (Bernard Bresslaw), a timid young monk who has difficulty fitting into his new path of life.

Unfortunately, upon their arrival they discover their hotel is only half-finished; the builders have just quit suddenly for unspecified reasons, leaving the remaining five floors unfinished. Distraught manager Pepe (Peter Butterworth) desperately tries to run the place in myriad different guises – the manager, the doorman and the porter – and the chef is his irate, ill-tempered wife, Floella (Hattie Jacques), who battles repeatedly with the temperamental stove while their handsome, womanising son Georgio (Ray Brooks) idles behind the bar. The hotel also hides an assortment of faults, and Pepe is soon overrun with complaints: Evelyn finds Mr Tuttle in her bath, Vic discovers Sadie naked in his shower; Lily and Marge's wardrobe has no back to it, allowing them to be accidentally seen by Brother Bernard in the opposite room; sand pours out of Moira's taps; the lavatory drenches Bert. The phone system itself is faulty, and the guests end up complaining to each other for much of the time. Nevertheless, Stuart is determined to ensure everyone has a good time.

Dinner on the first night is foul, and made even more unpleasant by the smoke from the burning food in the kitchen, which forces the motley group of holiday-makers to open the windows, prompting the arrival of mosquitos. Although agreeing to play leapfrog with Tuttle, Lily and Marge have their eyes on other things. Marge takes a shine to Brother Bernard, and they develop an innocent romance, while Lily lures the dashing Nicholas (David Kernan) away from his jealous (and, it is implied, gay) friend, Robin (John Clive). Meanwhile, Stanley attempts to seduce Cora whilst his nagging wife is not present, but Cora is more interested in keeping Vic away from Sadie, who grows fond of Bert. Vic tries to put Bert off Sadie by telling him that she is a black widow who murdered her two previous husbands, when in fact both were firemen who died on the job.

The next day, the holidaymakers are awakened very early in the morning by the builders, who have returned to work. While most of the party go off on an excursion to the nearby village, Stanley ensures his wife is left behind so that he can spend the day attempting to woo Cora. Vic samples a local drink, "Santa Cecelia's Elixir", which blesses the drinker with X-ray vision and he is able to see through women's clothing. However, the tourists are arrested for causing a riot at Madame Fifi's (Olga Lowe) local brothel after Vic, Bert and Eustace annoy the girls there; left-behind Evelyn is seduced by Georgio, which leads to her abandoning her frigid manners.

In the local prison, Miss Plunkett seduces the Chief of Police, and the tourists are released. Back at the hotel, Mrs Blunt resumes her sex life with a surprised Stanley after having a brief affair with Georgio. The last night in the hotel starts as a success, with all the guests at ease with each other thanks to the punch being spiked with Santa Cecelia's Elixir. Midway through the night it begins to rain, and the hotel is shown to have been constructed on a dry river bed. As the hotel begins to collapse Pepe finally loses his patience and sanity with the guests, intoxicated by the spiked punch, party on oblivious to the fact the hotel is disintegrating around them.

The film then shifts forward an unspecified period of time, and shows an Elsbels reunion at Vic and Cora's pub. Farquhar has also lost his job at Wundatours and started working at the pub. All the guests are happy, and reminisce about the holiday they barely survived.

Cast
Sid James as Vic Flange
Kenneth Williams as Stuart Farquhar
Charles Hawtrey as Eustace Tuttle
Joan Sims as Cora Flange
Peter Butterworth as Pepe
Kenneth Connor as Stanley Blunt
Hattie Jacques as Floella
Bernard Bresslaw as Brother Bernard
Barbara Windsor as Sadie Tomkins
Jimmy Logan as Bert Conway
June Whitfield as Evelyn Blunt
Sally Geeson as Lily Maggs
Carol Hawkins as Marge Dawes
Gail Grainger as Moira Plunkett
Ray Brooks as Georgio
John Clive as Robin Tweet
David Kernan as Nicholas Phipps
Patsy Rowlands as Miss Dobbs
Derek Francis as Brother Martin
Jack Douglas as Harry
Amelia Bayntun as Mrs Tuttle
Alan Curtis as Police Chief
Hugh Futcher as Jailer
Gertan Klauber as Postcard seller
Brian Osborne as Stall-holder
Olga Lowe as Madame Fifi

Crew
Screenplay – Talbot Rothwell
Music – Eric Rogers
Production Manager – Jack Swinburne
Art Director – Lionel Couch
Editor – Alfred Roome
Director of Photography – Alan Hume
Camera Operator – Jimmy Davis
Continuity – Joy Mercer
Assistant Director – David Bracknell
Sound Recordists – Taffy Haines & Ken Barker
Make-up – Geoffrey Rodway
Assistant Art Director – Bill Bennison
Set Dresser – Don Picton
Hairdresser – Stella Rivers
Costume Designer – Courtenay Elliott
Dubbing Editor – Peter Best
Assistant Editor – Jack Gardner
Titles – GSE Ltd
Processor – Rank Film Laboratories
Producer – Peter Rogers
Director – Gerald Thomas

Notes
The film's opening credits also include 'Sun Tan Lo Tion' (sun tan lotion) as 'Technical Director'.

The brothel keeper is played by Olga Lowe, one of the first actresses to work with Sid James when he arrived in the UK in 1946. Lowe was also the actress on stage with James on the night he died in Sunderland.

Filming and locations
Filming dates – 17 April–26 May 1972 (The previous entry – Carry On Matron – was released during filming)

Interior/exterior film locations:

Bagshot, Surrey: The road to the airport.

High Street, Slough: The Wundatours travel agency shop (the site has since been redeveloped and is now Cornwall House).

Pinewood Studios: Elsbels airport terminal building (the studios' security block); the Whippit Inn pub; Elsbels hotel interior and exterior scenes. (The hotel was constructed in the studio backlot with a matte added to represent the upper floors and sections of scaffold.)

References

Further reading

External links
 
 
Carry On Abroad at The Whippit Inn

1972 films
Abroad
Films directed by Gerald Thomas
Films set in hotels
1972 comedy films
Films shot at Pinewood Studios
Films produced by Peter Rogers
Films with screenplays by Talbot Rothwell
Films about vacationing
Films set on fictional islands
1970s English-language films
1970s British films